A neuroectodermal neoplasm is a neoplasm or tumor of the neuroectoderm. They are most commonly tumors in the central or peripheral nervous system.

Tumors exhibiting neuroectodermal differentiation are classified into two main groups:
 Group I tumors/neoplasms: neuroendocrine carcinomas. These show predominantly epithelial differentiation. They include pituitary adenoma and carcinoid tumor
 Group II tumors/neoplasms: nonepithelial neuroectodermal neoplasms. These are predominantly neural in origin. They include malignant melanoma, olfactory neuroblastoma and Ewing's sarcoma.

References 

Anatomical pathology
Nervous system neoplasia